Riccardo Minali (born 19 April 1995) is an Italian former cyclist, who competed as a professional from 2017 to 2021. He is the son of Nicola Minali, who was also a professional cyclist.

Major results

2013
 2nd  Omnium, UEC European Junior Track Championships
2015
 1st Circuito del Porto
 4th Memorial Denis Zanette e Daniele Del Ben
2016
 2nd Circuito del Porto
 3rd Coppa dei Laghi-Trofeo Almar
2017
 7th Overall Dubai Tour
 7th Brussels Cycling Classic
2018
 Tour de Langkawi
1st Stages 2 & 4
 5th Gran Piemonte
 5th Gran Premio Bruno Beghelli
 9th Grand Prix de Fourmies
2019
 4th Gooikse Pijl
2021
 5th Grote Prijs Jean-Pierre Monseré
 7th Gran Piemonte
 9th Grand Prix d'Isbergues

Grand Tour general classification results timeline

References

External links

1995 births
Living people
Italian male cyclists
Cyclists from the Province of Verona